Rebecca Q. Ivers  is an Australian academic known for her work in injury prevention and trauma care research.

Career and research
Ivers is Professor of Public Health, and Head of the School of Population Health at the University of New South Wales, an honorary Professorial Fellow at the George Institute for Global Health and National Health and Medical Research Council Senior Research Fellow. She was awarded the 2018 Elizabeth Blackburn Fellowship and named on the Australian Financial Review and Westpac 100 Women of Influence Awards in 2014.

She is an injury epidemiologist and a public health researcher. She has been credited with influencing Australian government legislation relating to graduated driver licensing.

She has also been involved in a number of studies working with Aboriginal and Torres Strait Islander communities, including analysis of driving behaviour and crashes and preventing avoidable injuries among children. Recent work on burn injury has highlighted the need for systems change regarding delivery of care.

Ivers has written editorials for the Sydney Morning Herald on topics including alcohol advertising and sports, gun laws, bicycle safety and helmets, and road safety in general. She has also written several editorials for Croakey on various public health topics. She has also commented on the equalizing effect of COVID-19 on academic research.

Ivers has overseen studies with a global reach examining the burden and risk factors for injury in low-income settings, including Vietnam, India and China. Current global projects involve a large scale initiative implementing community drowning interventions in Bangladesh, and work on scalable interventions for drowning in India and Vietnam. She also leads work on fracture care working with investigators from McMasters University on a NHMRC funded prospective study of 40,000 people examining the incidence and predictors of mortality in people sustaining traumatic fractures in low income country settings. She coauthored the WHO Step Safety Report which highlighted rates of life impacting falls and new prevention strategies.

Selected publications

Awards and honours 
 Fellow of the Royal Society of New South Wales, 2021
National Health and Medical Research Council Elizabeth Blackburn Fellowship (Public Health) 2018
 Winner, Innovation: Australian Financial Review and Westpac100 Women of Influence Awards 2014
 NSW Public Health Associations' Public Health Impact Award. July 2014
 Australian Injury Prevention Network (AIPN): 2013 AIPN Award for Sustained Achievement. November 2013
 Young Tall Poppy Award for Science. October 2008
National Health and Medical Research Council Achievement Award. December 2007

References

Academic staff of the University of New South Wales
Living people
Year of birth missing (living people)
Public health researchers
Australian women scientists
Fellows of the Royal Society of New South Wales